The Universities Act 1825 (6 Geo 4 c 97, long name An Act for the better Preservation of the Peace and good Order in the Universities of England) is an Act of the Parliament of the United Kingdom which provides for officers of police constable status within Cambridge and Oxford universities. Sections 3 and 4 have been repealed. In 2003, the University of Oxford closed its police force to avoid the complexity and costs of complying with new standards.

Section 1
Provision of appointment for abled personnel such as police constables deemed fit by the chancellor or vice-chancellor of the Universities of Cambridge and Oxford. Jurisdiction was within the precincts and four miles outside of the relevant universities.

Section 2
Provides for a pro vice chancellor, or deputy vice chancellor to create constables in the absence of the chancellor.

Section 3
Provided for the apprehension of prostitutes within the precincts of the university. This was repealed by Statute Law (Repeals) Act 1989 (c. 43), s. 1(1), Sch. 1 Part I.

Section 4
Defined the act as a Public Act. This was repealed by Statute Law Revision (No. 2) Act 1888 (c. 57).

See also
Cambridge University Constabulary
Oxford University Police
Universities Act - list of Acts

References

United Kingdom Acts of Parliament 1825
Private police
Law enforcement in England and Wales
19th century in Cambridgeshire
19th century in Oxfordshire
History of the University of Cambridge
History of the University of Oxford
University-related legislation
1825 in education